The Texas Peace Officers' Memorial is an outdoor monument commemorating law enforcement and corrections officers who died in service since August 5, 1823, installed on the Texas State Capitol grounds in Austin, Texas, United States. The memorial was designed by Linda Johnson and erected by the Texas Commission on Law Enforcement and Texas State Preservation Board in 1999. It features a granite obelisk on a base with a Texas Lone Star, as well as inscribed names along granite walls of those who died since Stephen F. Austin commissioned the Texas Peace Officers, or the Texas Ranger Division.

See also

 1999 in art

References

External links
 

1999 establishments in Texas
1999 sculptures
Granite sculptures in Texas
Law enforcement memorials
Monuments and memorials in Texas
Obelisks in the United States
Outdoor sculptures in Austin, Texas